Reputation is a lost 1917 American silent film drama film produced and distributed by the Mutual Film Company and starring Edna Goodrich. The film was directed by John B. O'Brien.

Plot
As described in a film magazine, Constance Bennett (Goodrich) is determined to make sufficient money to set her aunt up in business before her marriage, so she goes to New York City to work as a model in a cloak house. The manager Edmund Berste (Goldsmith), who has a jealous wife (Lee), takes a liking to Constance. The wife learns of this and goes to Constance's home town and denounces her. When Constance returns home, no one will have anything to do with her, so she returns to New York where her former employer Berste sets a trap for her. In order to save herself, Constance shoots Berste. However, at the trial she is acquitted, and shortly thereafter she and John Clavering (Hinckley) are married.

Cast
Edna Goodrich - Constance Bennett
William Hinckley - John Clavering
Frank Goldsmith - Edmund Berste
Carey Lee - Mrs. Berste 
Esther Evans - Nellie Burns, Stenographer
Nellie Parker Spaulding - Mrs. Williams
Mathilde Brundage - Mrs. Clavering (credited as Mrs. Mathilde Brudage)

References

External links

1917 films
American silent feature films
1917 drama films
American black-and-white films
Lost American films
Silent American drama films
1917 lost films
Lost drama films
Films directed by John B. O'Brien
1910s American films